The 2010 Oakland mayoral election was held on November 2, 2010 to elect the mayor of Oakland, California, electing Jean Quan to be their mayor. In early August 2010 (prior to the first election using "instant-runoff" voting), incumbent mayor Ron Dellums announced that he would not be seeking reelection to a second term. In November 2010, Oakland also (for the first time) instant-runoff voting to elect its mayor, three city council races and four other local offices, with the elections for the mayor and Oakland council district four requiring multiple rounds of counting. Oakland used instant-runoff voting in the city's remaining elected offices in 2012. IRV was again used in 2014 and 2016, including in the 2014 mayoral election in which incumbent Jean Quan was defeated by Libby Schaaf.

Municipal elections in California are officially non-partisan.

Background

 The city of Oakland had passed a measure in November 2006 to adopt instant-runoff voting for 18 city offices, with 69% of those counted in favor of the measure.
 This 2010 election was the first that Oakland held using instant-runoff voting.
 In early August 2010, incumbent mayor Ron Dellums announced that he would not be seeking reelection to a second term.
 This election resulted in the election of Jean Quan.

Candidates
Terence Candell, founder and head of Candell’s College Preparatory Academy
Arnold Fields, real estate broker and small business owner
Greg Harland, businessman
Marcie Hodge, member of Peralta Community College Board of Trustees since 2004, candidate for Oakland City Council in 2006
Rebecca Kaplan, at-large member of the Oakland City Council  since 2009, former at-large member of AC Transit Board (2002-2009)
Don MacLeay, metal cutter (Green Party)
Don Perata, former 9th district California State Senate member (1998-2008), former President pro tempore of the California State Senate (2004-2008), former 6th district member of the California State Assembly (1996-1998)
Jean Quan, District 4 member of the Oakland City Council
Joe Tuman, political commentator
Larry Lionel "LL" Young Jr., realtor

Results

Results summary
The following table shows a summary of the instant runoff for the election. The table shows the round in which the candidate was defeated or elected the winner, the votes for the candidate in that round, and what share those votes were of all votes counting for any candidate in that round. There is also a bar graph showing those votes for each candidate and categorized as either first-round votes or votes that were transferred from another candidate.

Vote counts by round
The following table shows how votes were counted in a series of rounds of instant runoffs. Each voter could mark which candidates were the voter's first, second, and third choice. Each voter had one vote, but could mark three choices for how that vote can be counted. In each round, the vote is counted for the most preferred candidate that has not yet been eliminated. Then one or more candidates with the fewest votes are eliminated. Votes that counted for an eliminated candidate are transferred to the voter's next most preferred candidate that has not yet been eliminated.

Continuing votes are votes that counted for a candidate in that round. Exhausted ballots represent votes that could not be transferred because a less preferred candidate was not marked on the ballot. Voters were allowed to mark only three choices because of voting system limitations. Over votes are votes that could not be counted for a candidate because more than one candidate was marked for a choice that was ready to be counted. Under votes are ballots were left blank or that only marked a choice for a write-in candidate that had not qualified as a write-in candidate.

References

2010 California elections
2010
San Francisco
2010s in Oakland, California